The Listener is a 2022 American drama film directed by Steve Buscemi and written by Alessandro Camon. It stars Tessa Thompson in the film's only on-screen role as a helpline volunteer.

Cast
 Tessa Thompson as Beth
 Logan Marshall-Green
 Derek Cecil
 Margaret Cho
 Blu Del Barrio
 Ricky Velez
 Alia Shawkat
 Jamie Hector
 Casey Wilson
 Bobby Soto
 Rebecca Hall

Production
The Listener is a contained drama written by Alessandro Camon and directed by Steve Buscemi. It is an American co-production between Olive Productions, Sight Unseen Pictures, Hantz Motion Pictures, and Atlas Industries. It stars Tessa Thompson in the film's only on-screen role. Filming took place in Los Angeles between August and September 2021. The feature film was announced on October 12, 2021, with reports that production had concluded.

Release
The film premiered as the closing film of the Giornate Degli Autori section of the 2022 Venice International Film Festival on September 9, 2022. It will also screen as part of the 2022 Toronto International Film Festival Industry Selects section.

References

External links
 

American drama films
Films directed by Steve Buscemi
Films shot in Los Angeles
2020s American films